The Physics of Superheroes is a popular science book by physics professor and long-time comic-book fan James Kakalios.  First published in 2005, it explores the basic laws of physics. Kakalios does not set out to show where the world of superheroes contradicts modern science, granting the heroes one or more "miracle exceptions" from natural law. Instead, he focuses on examples of comic book scenes that can be used to understand the diverse laws of physics from an unusual angle, such as Gwen Stacy's death and Ant-Man's ability to punch his way out of a paper bag. Kakalios relates these elements of comic books to principles of physics, such as levers and torque, and in this way covers diverse topics, from mechanics to the quantum world.

See also
The Physics of Star Trek

External links
The Physics of Superheroes webpage

Popular physics books
Gotham Books books
2005 non-fiction books